N. C. Jindal Public School is a co-educational secondary school in Punjabi Bagh, New Delhi, India. It is affiliated with the Central Board of Secondary Education and is operated by the Jindal conglomerate. 

The school provides good education in sciences, commerce, and humanities (except Geography). O. P. Jindal in an air-crash on 1 April 2005. 

The trustee is Smt. Savitri Jindal who is the wife of Late Shri O.P. Jindal. 

The school is located in very ample surroundings of West Delhi, which makes it an ideal learning institute.

What once started with tents and temporary hutments has grown to be one of the most recognised and happening places in the entire region of West Delhi, which has further been brought into limelight by being honoured with the British Council's International School Award. Its motto remains to nurture 'Global Citizens' till date and is one of the most upcoming institutions to be affiliated with.

External links
Alumni website
School website

Schools in Delhi
Schools in West Delhi
1966 establishments in Delhi
Educational institutions established in 1966